Escalator is the only album by the Sam Gopal band, released in 1969 on the small Stable Records label. The band also recorded "Horse" and a Willie Dixon cover "Back Door Man", which survive on acetate, and appear on the re-released album as bonus tracks. Ian Fraser Kilmister, later known as Lemmy, joined the band after playing in The Rockin' Vickers, but appears as Ian Willis, as he was considering changing his surname to that of his stepfather George Willis.

Track listing

Personnel
Sam Gopal: tabla, percussion; drums in "Season of the Witch" and "Midsummer Night's Dream"
Ian Willis (Lemmy Kilmister): vocals, lead & rhythm guitar
Roger D'Elia: lead & rhythm guitar, acoustic guitar in "Yesterlove"
Phil Duke: bass guitar

References

Sam Gopal albums
1969 debut albums